N'dalatando Airport  is an airport serving the city of N'dalatando, in Cuanza Norte Province, Angola.

See also

 List of airports in Angola
 Transport in Angola

References

External links
HERE/Nokia - N'dalatandos
OurAirports - N'dalatandos
OpenStreetMap - N'dalatandos
Bing Maps - N'dalatando

Airports in Angola